James Thatcher or Thacker ( 1536–1565) was an English politician.

He was a Member (MP) of the Parliament of England for Derby in 1558.

References

Year of birth missing
1565 deaths
English MPs 1558